Darke Hall is a 610 seat performance hall located in Regina, Saskatchewan, Canada. The hall was named for Francis Nicholson Darke, the former mayor of Regina. Designed by architect J.H. Puntin, the hall was built in 1928 and had its inaugural concert opening on 6 January 1929. While the hall currently serves as the main performance venue for the Conservatory of Music at the University of Regina, for many years the venue was the city of Regina's main concert hall and the home of the Regina Symphony Orchestra. That changed after the Saskatchewan Centre of the Arts opened in 1970.

Many notable entertainers have performed at Darke Hall, including  Barra MacNeils, Jorge Bolet, Jane Coop, Denise Djokic, Marjorie Lawrence, Nino Martini, Nan Merriman, Jan Peerce, Sarah Slean, Teresa Stratas, Jean Watson, Hawksley Workman, and Efrem Zimbalist.

References

Buildings and structures in Regina, Saskatchewan
Theatres in Saskatchewan
Music venues in Saskatchewan